Charles Ross Somerville (September 9, 1856 – March 28, 1931) was a manufacturer and politician in Ontario, Canada. He served as mayor of London from 1918 to 1919.

Biography 
The son of John Brown Somerville and Elizabeth McKinnon, he was born in Morton, Leeds County and was educated in Goderich. In 1888, he established himself in business in London as a manufacturer of paper boxes and confections. Somerville retired from business in 1909.

His first wife, May Maddocks, died in 1896. He remarried to Christina Wilson on July 1, 1891, and they had two sons.

Somerville served on the public school board and on the board of governors for the University of Western Ontario. He ran unsuccessfully for the London seat in the Canadian House of Commons in 1921 as a Liberal, losing to John Franklin White.

Somerville Limited was purchased in 1910 by J. K. and D. H. McDermid and expanded over time, with five plants in London(2), Walkerville, Strathroy and Neustad. In 1944, the company was taken over by W. Garfield Weston; four of the five plants were replaced by a larger facility in Crumlin, Ontario and seven additional plants were built by 1969. He died in New York City after an illness in 1931 and was buried in London.

References

External links 
 

1856 births
1931 deaths
Mayors of London, Ontario
People from Leeds and Grenville United Counties